Eluru Old bus station is a bus station located in Eluru city of the Indian state of Andhra Pradesh. It is owned by Andhra Pradesh State Road Transport Corporation. It operates buses to all parts of the District and to nearby cities.

References

Bus stations in Eluru